Philippe Lesage is a Canadian film director and screenwriter from Quebec. Originally a documentary filmmaker, he moved into narrative feature filmmaking in the 2010s with the films Copenhague: A Love Story, The Demons (Les Démons) and Genesis (Genèse).

Born in Saint-Agapit, Quebec and raised in Longueuil and Montreal, Lesage studied at McGill University and the European Film College. His first documentary film, Pourrons-nous vivre ensemble?, was released in 2006. He won a Jutra Award for Best Documentary in 2012 for Ce cœur qui bat.

The Demons premièred at San Sebastian International Film Festival in Official Competition. It has since been selected in more than 70 festivals around the world and has won several awards. The Demons was selected in Guy Lodge's Top Ten Films of 2015 in Variety and in the Toronto International Film Festival Canada's Top Ten. It won the Golden Gate New Director Prize at the San Francisco International Film Festival in 2016 and the Quebec Film Critic Association honoured the film with its two annually awards: Best Canadian film of 2015 and Best Film from the International Competition of the Montreal Film Festival of New Cinema.

In 2018, he directed Genesis (Genèse). Premiered at the Locarno Festival in the International Competition, the film has won numerous awards including the Golden Wolf (Festival of New Cinema, Montreal), Best Film and Best Director Awards at Seminci in Valladolid (Spain) and Best Film at Los Cabos International Film Festival'(Mexico) festivals.  The film was also selected at the renowned Museum of Modern Art and Film Society of Lincoln Center's New Directors/New Films Festival,  AFI FEST, and Rotterdam Film Festival. It ranked #16 best films of 2019 by Metacritic.

Lesage has also taught documentary filmmaking at the European Film College in 2008–2009.

His brother Jean-François Lesage is also a filmmaker.

Films

 2006: Pourrons-nous vivre ensemble? 
 2009: How Can You Tell If the Little Fish Are Happy? (Comment savoir si les petits poissons sont heureux?) 
 2010: The Heart that Beats (Ce cœur qui bat)
 2012: Laylou
 2015: The Demons (Les Démons)
 2016: Copenhague: A Love Story
 2018: Genesis (Genèse)

Awards and nominations

 2010: Award for Best National Documentary, RIDM
 2010: Award for Best New Director, RIDM 
 2012: Jutra Award 2012, Best Documentary
 2015: Critic Award (AQCC) for Best Film, International Competition, Festival of New Cinema, 2015
 2016: Canada's Top Ten, Toronto International Film Festival
 2016: Nomination for Best Film, Gala du Cinema Quebecois
 2016: Nomination for Best Director, Gala du Cinéma Québécois
 2016: Gilles-Carles Award for Best First or Second feature fiction film
 2016: Luc-Perreault Award / AQCC for Best Film from Quebec
 2016: Nomination for Best Film,  Canadian Screen Awards
 2016: Nomination for Best achievement in Directing, Canadian Screen Awards
 2016: Nomination for The Ingmar Bergman International Debut Award
 2016: Titanic Award for Best Film, International Competition, Budapest
 2016: Golden Gate New Director Prize, San Francisco International Film Festival
 2018 : Golden Wolf for Best Feature Film International Competition Festival du nouveau cinéma
 2018 : Golden Spike for Best Feature Film International Competition Festival international  du film de Valladolid
 2018 : Best Director Festival international  du film de Valladolid
 2018 : Best Feature Film Award International Los Cabos International Film Festival
 2018: Canada's Top Ten, Toronto International Film Festival

References

External links

Film directors from Quebec
Canadian documentary film directors
Canadian screenwriters in French
Writers from Quebec
Living people
People from Chaudière-Appalaches
People from Longueuil
McGill University alumni
Year of birth missing (living people)